Polymerus is a genus of plant bugs in the family Miridae. There are at least 100 described species in Polymerus.

See also
 List of Polymerus species

References

Further reading

External links

 

 
Miridae genera
Mirini
Taxa named by Carl Wilhelm Hahn